Maik Außendorf (born 17 August 1971) is a German politician of the Alliance 90/The Greens who has been serving as a member of the Bundestag from the state of North Rhine-Westphalia since the 2021 German federal election.

Early life and career 
Außendorf has a background in mathematics and computer technology.

Political career 
In parliament, Außendorf has since been a member of the Committee on Economic Affairs and the Committee on Digital Affairs.

Other activities 
 Federal Network Agency for Electricity, Gas, Telecommunications, Post and Railway (BNetzA), Member of the Advisory Board (since 2022)
 German Cyclist’s Association (ADFC), Member
 German Federation for the Environment and Nature Conservation (BUND), Member

References

External links 
 

Living people
1971 births
Place of birth missing (living people)
21st-century German politicians
Members of the Bundestag for Alliance 90/The Greens
Members of the Bundestag 2021–2025